Roscam is a medieval ecclesiastical site and National Monument located in County Galway, Ireland.

Location

History

Roscam stands on the site of a very early (5th century) monastery, with legend linking it to Saint Patrick. It was also associated with Odran, a brother of Ciarán of Clonmacnoise (6th century). The 6th-century Saint Aedus (Aidus) transferred the bones of Brión mac Echach Muigmedóin to Roscam. It was attacked by Vikings in AD 807.

The round tower is dated to the 11th century and appears to have never been completed. The ruined tower once marked the limit of O'Halloran (Ó hAllmhuráin, Clann Fhearghaile) territory.

The church was built in the 15th century.

Roscam is said to have been used as a duelling site in the medieval era; it is well outside Galway city and is easily accessible by boat.

Ruins and monuments

There is a limestone round tower ( tall), bullauns and a church  in length. The whole site is surrounded by a large enclosure.

References

Religion in County Galway
Archaeological sites in County Galway
National Monuments in County Galway
Round towers